Juha Lallukka (born 27 October 1979 in Kouvola) is a Finnish cross-country skier who competed between 2002 and 2018. He finished 34th in the 15 km event at the 2010 Winter Olympics in Vancouver, British Columbia, Canada.

Lallukka's best finish at the FIS Nordic World Ski Championships was fourth in the 4 × 10 km relay in Oslo in 2011 while his best individual finish was eighth in the 50 km event at the same championships.

His best World Cup result was a third-fastest stage time in the 15 km pursuit race in Falun in 2009.

On 16 November 2011 it was reported that he had tested positive for HGH. He was banned for two years.

Cross-country skiing results
All results are sourced from the International Ski Federation (FIS).

Olympic Games

World Championships

World Cup

Season standings

Individual podiums
 1 podium – (1 )

References

External links

1979 births
Living people
People from Kouvola
Cross-country skiers at the 2010 Winter Olympics
Finnish male cross-country skiers
Finnish sportspeople in doping cases
Olympic cross-country skiers of Finland
Doping cases in cross-country skiing
Sportspeople from Kymenlaakso
21st-century Finnish people